Karam Bast (also known as Karambās) is a village in Poshtdarband Rural District, Central District, Kermanshah County, Kermanshah Province, Iran. At the 2006 census, its population was 638, in 166 families.

References 

Populated places in Kermanshah County